Earlimart is an unincorporated community in Tulare County, California, United States. At the 2010 census, the CDP population was 8,537, up from 6,583 at the 2000 census. For statistical purposes, the Census Bureau defines Earlimart as a census-designated place (CDP).

History

In the early 1890s, the Dalton Gang was accused and convicted of robbing a Southern Pacific Railroad train at Earlimart, when the community was known as Alila.

Community members changed its name to Earlimart in 1910, choosing that name because the variety of melons grown by local farmers ripened early, and thus were considered “early to market”—hence, “Earli-mart.” Tulare County's Earlimart branch library was established in October 1914 in the Alila School.

Geography

Demographics

2010
At the 2010 census Earlimart had a population of 8,537. The racial makeup of Earlimart was 3,193 (37.4%) White, 67 (0.8%) African American, 45 (0.5%) Native American, 536 (6.3%) Asian, 0 (0.0%) Pacific Islander, 4,303 (50.4%) from other races, and 393 (4.6%) from two or more races. Hispanic or Latino of any race were 7,805 persons (91.4%).

The whole population lived in households, no one lived in non-institutionalized group quarters and no one was institutionalized.

There were 1,946 households, 1,350 (69.4%) had children under the age of 18 living in them, 1,201 (61.7%) were opposite-sex married couples living together, 369 (19.0%) had a female householder with no husband present, 166 (8.5%) had a male householder with no wife present. There were 169 (8.7%) unmarried opposite-sex partnerships, and 3 (0.2%) same-sex married couples or partnerships. 174 households (8.9%) were one person and 86 (4.4%) had someone living alone who was 65 or older. The average household size was 4.39. There were 1,736 families (89.2% of households); the average family size was 4.57.

The age distribution was 3,416 people (40.0%) under the age of 18, 1,044 people (12.2%) aged 18 to 24, 2,234 people (26.2%) aged 25 to 44, 1,334 people (15.6%) aged 45 to 64, and 509 people (6.0%) who were 65 or older. The median age was 23.5 years. For every 100 females, there were 105.3 males. For every 100 females age 18 and over, there were 104.1 males.

There were 2,023 housing units at an average density of 960.4 per square mile, of the occupied units 1,010 (51.9%) were owner-occupied and 936 (48.1%) were rented. The homeowner vacancy rate was 1.0%; the rental vacancy rate was 2.1%. 4,590 people (53.8% of the population) lived in owner-occupied housing units and 3,947 people (46.2%) lived in rental housing units.

2000
At the 2000 census there were 6,583 people, 1,501 households, and 1,319 families in the CDP. The racial makeup of the CDP was 19.32% White, 0.82% African American, 1.32% Native American, 8.08% Asian, 0.05% Pacific Islander, 65.23% from other races, and 5.18% from two or more races. Hispanic or Latino of any race were 87.50%.

Of the 1,501 households 59.1% had children under the age of 18 living with them, 59.9% were married couples living together, 18.9% had a female householder with no husband present, and 12.1% were non-families. 8.8% of households were one person and 4.5% were one person aged 65 or older. The average household size was 4.39 and the average family size was 4.61.

The age distribution was 42.3% under the age of 18, 12.9% from 18 to 24, 25.7% from 25 to 44, 13.1% from 45 to 64, and 6.0% 65 or older. The median age was 22 years. For every 100 females, there were 107.7 males. For every 100 females age 18 and over, there were 104.9 males.

The median household income was $21,299 and the median family income  was $21,544. Males had a median income of $20,653 versus $18,438 for females. The per capita income for the CDP was $7,169. About 38.1% of families and 41.9% of the population were below the poverty line, including 50.7% of those under age 18 and 17.1% of those age 65 or over.

Government

Notable people
Dack Rambo - actor known for work on television's Dallas and Another World and film Which Way to the Front?

Further reading

References

Census-designated places in Tulare County, California
Census-designated places in California